The 2015 CONCACAF Men's Olympic Qualifying Championship was the fourteenth edition of the CONCACAF Men's Olympic Qualifying, the quadrennial, international, age-restricted football tournament organized by CONCACAF to determine which men's under-23 national teams from the North, Central America and Caribbean region qualify for the Olympic football tournament. It was held in the United States, from 1 and 13 October 2015

Mexico successfully defended their title after a 2–0 win over Honduras in the final. It was their seventh Pre-Olympic title and second in a row, after previous wins in 1964, 1972, 1976, 1996, 2004 and 2012. As the top two teams, Mexico and Honduras both qualified for the 2016 Summer Olympics in Brazil as the CONCACAF representatives, just as the same sides had in the previous Olympics. Third-placed United States later lost to Colombia in the CONCACAF–CONMEBOL play-off and failed to qualify for the Olympics for the second consecutive time.

Qualification

The eight berths were allocated to the three regional zones as follows:
Three teams from the North American Zone (NAFU), i.e., Canada, Mexico and the hosts United States, who all qualified automatically due to them being the only teams in the region
Three teams from the Central American Zone (UNCAF)
Two teams from the Caribbean Zone (CFU)

Regional qualification tournaments were held to determine the five teams joining Canada, Mexico, and the United States at the tournament final.

Qualified teams
The following teams qualified for the tournament final.

Venues
Four cities served as the venues for tournament.

Draw

The draw for the tournament took place on 18 August 2015 at 09:00 PDT (UTC−7) at the Torrance Marriot Redondo Beach hotel in Torrance, California. The draw was conducted by Eddie Lewis and Brad Friedel.

The eight teams were drawn into two groups of four teams. Tournament host United States were seeded in Group A, while defending CONCACAF Olympic Qualifying Championship champion and 2012 Olympic gold medalist Mexico were seeded in Group B.

The draw took place before the UNCAF final qualifier (Costa Rica) had been confirmed.

Match officials

Referees
 Adrian Skeete
 Christopher Reid
 Mathieu Bourdeau
 Drew Fischer
 Hugo Cruz
 Juan Guerra
 Armando Castro
 Karl Tyrell
 Luis Santander
 Jafeth Perea
 Javier Santos
 Armando Villarreal

Assistant referees
 Ricardo Ake
 Joe Fletcher
 Carlos Fernandez
 Ronaldo De La Cruz
 Oscar Velazquez
 Israel Valenciano
 Ronald Bruna
 Jairo Morales
 Graeme Brown
 Ainsley Rochard
 Frank Anderson
 Corey Rockwell

Squads

Players born on or after 1 January 1993 were eligible to compete in the tournament. Each team could register a maximum of 20 players (two of whom must be goalkeepers).

Group stage
The top two teams of each group advanced to the semi-finals. The teams were ranked according to points (3 points for a win, 1 point for a draw, 0 points for a loss). If tied on points, tiebreakers would be applied in the following order:
Goal difference in all group matches;
Greatest number of goals scored in all group matches;
Greatest number of points obtained in the group matches between the teams concerned;
Goal difference resulting from the group matches between the teams concerned;
Greater number of goals scored in all group matches between the teams concerned;
Drawing of lots.

The final round of fixtures in the group stage and the knockout stage fell within the FIFA International Match Calendar period of 5–13 October 2015. As a result, teams were able to call on their first choice under-23 players worldwide.

All times were local.

Group A

Group B

Knockout stage
In the knockout stage, extra time and a penalty shoot-out were used to decide the winner if necessary.

Bracket

Semi-finals
The semi-final winners qualified for the 2016 Summer Olympics.

Third place play-off
The winners advanced to the CONCACAF–CONMEBOL play-off.

Final

Statistics

Goalscorers
4 goals

 Alberth Elis
 Jerome Kiesewetter

3 goals

 Michael Petrasso
 Erick Torres
 Jordan Morris

2 goals

 Anthony Lozano
 Marco Bueno
 Raúl López
 Arichel Hernández
 Luis Gil

1 goal

 Molham Babouli
 Ben Fisk
 Skylar Thomas
 Dylan Flores
 Maikel Reyes
 Daniel Luis Sáez
 Paulson Pierre
 Víctor Guzmán
 Hirving Lozano
 Édgar Joel Bárcenas
 Josiel Núñez
 Cameron Carter-Vickers
 Alonso Hernández
 Emerson Hyndman
 Matt Miazga
 Marc Pelosi

1 own goal

 William Fernández (playing against Mexico)
 Bryan Acosta (playing against Mexico)
 Fidel Escobar (playing against USA)

Awards
The following awards were given at the conclusion of the tournament.

Final ranking
As per statistical convention in football, matches decided in extra time were counted as wins and losses, while matches decided by a penalty shoot-out were counted as draws.

Qualified teams for Olympics
The following two teams from CONCACAF qualified for the 2016 Summer Olympics.

1 Bold indicates champion for that year. Italic indicates host for that year.

Broadcasters

Television

Cuban defections

Four Cuban players were confirmed to have defected to the United States during the tournament: they were Emmanuel Labrada (CF Granma), Frank López García (FC Cienfuegos), Dairon Pérez (FC La Habana), and Yendry Torres (FC Cienfuegos).

References

External links
Olympic Qualifying – Men, CONCACAF.com

 
2015
Olympic Qualifying Championship, Men's
Football at the 2016 Summer Olympics – Men's qualification
Olympic Qualifying Championship, Men's
2015 CONCACAF Men's Olympic Qualifying Championship